Christine Mary Chinkin  is a Professor of International Law and founding Director of the Centre for Women, Peace and Security at the London School of Economics and Political Science and the 
William W. Cook Global Law Professor at the University of Michigan Law School. She was a member of the four-person United Nations Fact Finding Mission on the Gaza Conflict created by the United Nations Human Rights Council.
From January 2010, she is a member of the Human Rights Advisory Panel of the United Nations Mission in Kosovo. She is the Chair of the International Law Association, appointed in 2021.

Chinkin studied law at the University of London, earning an LLB with honors in 1971 and an LLM in 1972. She later received a second LLM from the Yale Law School in 1981 and completed her PhD at the University of Sydney in 1990. She has served on the law faculty at the University of Sydney and as dean of the law faculty at the University of Southampton.

She was appointed Companion of the Order of St Michael and St George (CMG) in the 2017 Birthday Honours for services to advancing women's human rights worldwide.

Christine Chinkin was scientific advisor to the Council of Europe Committee that drafted the Istanbul Convention. She is currently a member of the steering board of the Preventing Sexual Violence in Conflict Initiative of the UK Government, and specialist advisor to the House of Lords Select Committee on Sexual Violence in Conflict.

Works

As author
 Dispute Resolution in Australia, co-authored with Hilary Astor, Butterworths, 1992
 The Boundaries of International Law: A Feminist Analysis, co-authored with Hilary Charlesworth, Manchester University Press, 2000
 The Making of International Law, co-authored with Alan Boyle, Oxford University Press, 2007
 International Law and New Wars, co-authored with Mary Kaldor, Cambridge University Press, 2017

As editor
 Sovereignty, Statehood and State Responsibility: Essays in Honour of James Crawford, co-edited with Freya Baetens, Cambridge University Press, 2015

References

External links

Living people
Alumni of the University of London
Yale Law School alumni
University of Sydney alumni
International law scholars
Academic staff of the University of Sydney
Academics of the University of Southampton
Academics of the London School of Economics
Fellows of the British Academy
University of Michigan Law School faculty
Companions of the Order of St Michael and St George
Year of birth missing (living people)
British women non-fiction writers